
Gmina Kruszwica is an urban-rural gmina (administrative district) in Inowrocław County, Kuyavian-Pomeranian Voivodeship, in north-central Poland.

The gmina contains part of the protected area called Gopło Landscape Park.

Villages
Apart from the town of Kruszwica, Gmina Kruszwica contains the villages and settlements of Arturowo, Baranowo, Bródzki, Brześć, Cykowo, Giżewo, Głębokie, Gustawowo, Janikowo, Janocin, Karczyn, Kraszyce, Łagiewniki, Maszenice, Mietlica, Morgi, Orpikowo, Ostrówek, Przedbojewice, Różniaty, Rzepiszyn, Skotniki, Słabęcin, Tarnówko, Witowice, Zaborowo, Żerniki and Żwanowice.

Neighbouring gminas
Gmina Kruszwica is bordered by the gminas of Dąbrowa Biskupia, Dobre, Inowrocław, Jeziora Wielkie, Piotrków Kujawski, Radziejów, Skulsk and Strzelno.

References
Polish official population figures 2006

Kruszwica
Inowrocław County